Dennis King (1897–1971) was an English actor and singer.

Dennis King may also refer to:

Dennis King (author), American non-fiction author
Dennis King (politician), Canadian politician, premier of Prince Edward Island

See also
Denis King, English composer and singer
Denis Grant King, archaeological draftsman